A knish  is a traditional Ashkenazi Jewish snack food consisting of a filling covered with dough that is typically baked or sometimes deep fried.

Knishes are often purchased from street vendors in urban areas with a large Jewish population, sometimes at a hot dog stand, or from a butcher shop. They are still strongly associated with New York City cuisine, possibly because of the iconic Yonah Schimmel's Knish Bakery restaurant, located on the Lower East Side of Manhattan, traditionally a Jewish neighbourhood. Knishes were popularized in North America by Ashkenazi Jewish refugees from the Pale of Settlement (mainly from present-day Belarus, Lithuania, Ukraine, and eastern Poland).

In most traditional versions, the filling is made entirely of mashed potato, kasha (buckwheat groats), or cheese. Other varieties of fillings include beef, chicken, sweet potatoes, black beans, or spinach.

Knishes may be round, rectangular, or square. They may be entirely covered in dough or some of the filling may peek out of the top. Sizes range from those that can be eaten in a single bite hors d'oeuvre to sandwich-sized.

History in the United States

Ashkenazi Jewish immigrants who arrived sometime around 1900 brought knishes to the United States. Knish (קניש) is a Yiddish word of Slavic origin, related to the Ukrainian knysh (книш)  and Polish knysz. The ancestor of the knish was a medieval fried vegetable patty or fritter called knysz; eventually it became a stuffed item. In Ukraine, the knysz evolved into a filled yeasted bun, and today is usually sweet rather than savoury; the Ukrainian cousin to the Jewish knish is the pyrizhok (пиріжки). Knishes began to be baked (rather than fried) around the same time that the potato was popularized in Eastern Europe, and the dough wrapper gradually became more like pastry than bread.

The first knish bakery in America was founded in New York City in 1910. Generally recognized as a food made popular in New York City by Jewish immigrants in the early 20th century, the United States underwent a knish renaissance in the 2000s driven by knish specialty establishments such as Knishes and Dishes in Philadelphia, the Knish Shop in Baltimore, Maryland, Buffalo and Bergen in Washington, DC, or My Mother's Knish, in Westlake Village, California.

In the 20th century, New York City and state politicians portrayed themselves eating knishes to show solidarity with Jewish working-class people. The trend declined after suburbanization and the policies of Ed Koch and Rudy Giuliani that restricted the sale of knishes from food carts.

See also

References

External links 
 
 
 Fortnite Battle Pass

Jewish baked goods
Ashkenazi Jewish cuisine
Dumplings
Potato dishes
Savoury pies
Cuisine of New York City
Snack foods
Street food
Jewish cuisine